"Goodies" is the debut single by American singer Ciara featuring hip-hop rapper and Jive recording artist Petey Pablo for her debut studio album of the same name. The song was released as the album's lead single on June 8, 2004, through LaFace Records. It was written by Ciara, Sean Garrett, LeMarquis Jefferson, and Craig Love, and Lil Jon the song's producer. The song was recorded as an answer song to the featured performer's hit single, "Freek-a-Leek."  The song's lead woman refuses men's sexual advances, proclaiming that they will not get her "goodies" because "they stay in the jar."

The single was well-received by critics, who acclaimed its whistling crunk beat and Ciara's breathy vocals. "Goodies" was a commercial success, peaking at number one on the US Billboard Hot 100 for seven weeks, becoming the longest-running number-one debut single by a female artist on the chart since 1977. Internationally, "Goodies" topped the charts in the United Kingdom and peaked within the top 10 of the charts in Germany, New Zealand, and Switzerland. The song gave Ciara the title as the "First Lady or Princess of Crunk&B."

The song's accompanying music video, directed by Benny Boom, featured guest appearances from  BoneCrusher, Monica, Rasheeda, Jazze Pha, Young Jeezy, and Lil Jon. The video depicts Ciara dancing in front of a blue and white background with her backup dancers. This scene is where Ciara first does the "Matrix," which later became her signature move. The song was performed on BET's 106 & Park and at the 2005 Billboard Music Awards along with "1, 2 Step" and "Oh".

Background
After leaving the group Hearsay at the age of 15, Atlanta native Ciara earned a writing job via her manager, for Atlanta's Tricky Stewart and The-Dream's RedZone Entertainment, penning songs for Mýa and Fantasia among others. According to Ciara, no one believed in her dreams of hearing her own music on the radio until she met producer Jazze Pha in 2002. Within five months of meeting her, Pha signed her to his Sho'nuff label and they had already recorded five tracks. About Ciara, Jazze Pha said, "What was really lacking is the Janet Jackson, high-energy dance [music]. Ciara fills that void. She's pretty, she can dance, she can write music, and kids love her. Everyone loves her."

Writing

Riverdale, Georgia in 2003, she was signed by LaFace Records executive, L.A. Reid, whom she was introduced to by Jazze Pha. She began production on her debut album later that year. In early 2004, Ciara wrote a demo with record producer, Sean Garrett, co-writer of Usher's crunk hit "Yeah!" After hearing a demo, crunk producer Lil Jon, who also produced and was featured on "Yeah!", began to work on the full record, to have it released on LaFace, which was also Usher's label.

However, she decided to use the song to go against the spot and deliver lyrics in contrast of female promiscuity lines delivered by fellow female artists. To give her a title to stand out, Lil Jon called Ciara as the "Princess of Crunk&B." Called the female counterpart to "Yeah!" and fellow crunk hit "Freek-a-Leek" by Petey Pablo, Laface looked to capitalize on the success of the previous songs.

The song was originally titled "Cookies"; however Lil Jon encouraged Ciara and Sean Garrett to revise the song, with the final version being "Goodies". In August 2020, Ciara revealed that her label almost shopped the song to Britney Spears.

Composition

"Goodies" is heavily influenced by male-version crunk song "Yeah!" and also has been compared to Kelis's "Milkshake." The song makes use of a repeated whistle, "faux operated vocals" in parts and a western guitar riff near the end.
"Goodies" is a midtempo crunk&B song. The song features a whistling beat, with several crunk-pop synths throughout its course. The songs features a guitar rhythm as it opens into its third verse and in its outro. Petey Pablo raps the first part of the first and third verses, while Ciara sings the rest of the song.

Critical reception
The song received positive reviews from music critics.  Fazed.com called the song "both clever and ironic considering how sexy her image" and "singularly disarming combination of an empowering message backed by an intoxicatingly sexy beat."  The Situation declared the track as "a great dance tune with a solid beat." Also, it noted Ciara shows "a lot of attitude, with girl empowering lyrics." Slant published, "it's not the chorus that gets stuck in your head... but the incessant oscillating whistle (I swear you can hear dogs barking halfway through the song)."  Musiccomh.com reviewed, "Goodies" as "an instantly recognisable tune" and called it a "typically upbeat benefiting from Lil' Jon."

Hiphopgalaxy.com called the track an "ultimate party anthem of the summer, but it's one of the best singles of the year." The song has "an infectious chorus" and "a crunked up groove."  Blender published that Ciara "sounds like she's rapping right back at him, delivering her lines in a measured, sultry cadence with hardly any variation in tone or pitch." In 2005, "Goodies" was nominated for "Best R&B/Soul or Rap Song of the Year" at Soul Train Lady of Soul Music Awards and in 2006. It won the Best Performed Songs in the ASCAP Repertory for the 2005 Survey Year at the ASCAP Pop Music Awards, including "1, 2 Step" and "Oh."

Chart performance
In the issue dated June 19, 2004, "Goodies" debuted at number 85 on the US Hot R&B/Hip-Hop Singles & Tracks—now known as the Hot R&B/Hip-Hop Songs chart. It went on to peak at number one on the chart for six consecutive weeks. The song debuted at number 94 on the US Billboard Hot 100 on July 27, 2004. The song quickly became a commercial success as it reached the summit of the chart after only twelve weeks. It spent seven weeks at number one, becoming the longest-running number-one debut single by a female artist since 1977. It reached three on the Mainstream Top 40 chart.  It ranked number nine on the 2004 U.S. Billboard year-end chart. According to the Billboard Hot 100 decade-end chart, it is the 31st most successful song of the 2000s. The single was certified platinum by the Recording Industry Association of America (RIAA) for sales of over a million digital copies in the United States.

In the United Kingdom, "Goodies" debuted at number 68 on the UK Singles Chart on January 9, 2005—for the week ending January 15, 2005. Two weeks later on the week ending January 29, 2005, it went at the top of the charts summit which interrupted Elvis Presley's three week chart reign. It topped the chart for one week. "Goodies" become the second ever crunk song to top the UK Singles Chart, after "Yeah!" by Usher featuring Lil Jon and Ludacris achieved the feat 10 months previously. In the Republic of Ireland, the song debuted and peaked at number four on the Irish Singles Chart.

In Switzerland, the song debuted at number 38 on the Swiss Singles Chart, before peaking at number 10 five weeks later. In Australia, "Goodies" debuted at number 22 on the ARIA Singles Chart, before falling to 23 in its second week. The song recovered in its third week to reach a new peak at 19 name="aus" /> In New Zealand, the single debuted at number 12 on the RIANZ Singles chart, and peaked at 10 in the next week. In Germany, the song debuted at number 16 on the German Singles Chart, before peaking at 10 two weeks later. In France, the song debuted at number 29 on the French Singles Chart, before peaking at 27 in its second week.

Music video
The music video for "Goodies" was directed by Benny Boom.  It shows Ciara and her friends driving in an Oldsmobile 442 convertible along the Atlanta streets to the local car wash. It features cameo appearances by BoneCrusher, Monica, Rasheeda, Jazze Pha, Young Jeezy, Lil Jon and among others.  Ciara filmed the video for 27 straight hours with director Benny Boom.  It begins with Ciara coming out her house. Her friend screams out, "What up dawg?!" and Ciara replies the same way. Ciara's sister then runs outside saying that Jazze Pha is on the phone. Jazze tells Ciara that they are going to the carwash to hang out and Ciara says she will also be coming along. She then gives the phone back to her sister and tells her to stay out of her room. The song then begins and Ciara starts singing her intro once Petey Pablo raps his verse. During this intro, we see Ciara going along with her friends driving to the carwash. On her way there she meets a few young men and invites them to the carwash. She then arrives to the carwash and meets up with different people, including Monica. During the song, Ciara dances in front of a blue and white background with her backup dancers. This scene is where Ciara first does the "Matrix," her signature move. The extended version of the video includes Ciara full-length dance with the backup dancers, and also features more of her and Monica duo shot.

Live performances
Ciara performed "Goodies" several times. Her first-ever performance of "Goodies" was on BET's 106 & Park. In 2005, Ciara performed the song, along with "1, 2 Step" and "Oh," at the 2005 Billboard Music Awards. She also performed the song at various summer festivals around the United States.

Formats and track listings
These are the formats and track listings of major single releases of "Goodies."

US digital download
"Goodies" featuring Petey Pablo

UK CD single number one
"Goodies" featuring Petey Pablo
"Goodies"

UK CD single number two
 "Goodies" featuring Petey Pablo
 "Goodies" featuring T.I. and Jazze Pha
 "Goodies (Richard X Remix)" featuring M.I.A. 
 "Goodies (Bimbo Jones Remix)" 
 "Goodies" (video)
 "Goodies" (ringtone)

German and French maxi single
"Goodies" featuring Petey Pablo
"Goodies"
"Goodies" featuring T.I. and Jazze Pha

French CD single
"Goodies" featuring Petey Pablo
"Goodies" featuring T.I. and Jazze Pha

Personnel
Recording 
Hitco, Atlanta, Georgia and Circle House Studios, Miami, FL and Sony Music Studios, NYC

Credits
Ciara — vocals
Petey Pablo — vocals
Lil Jon — additional vocals, production, mixing, drum programming, sound design
Sean Garrett — vocal production
Charles Sanders — engineer
Steve Nowacynski — engineer
Brian Stanley — engineer
Ray Seay — mixing
Brian Stanley — mixing
Craig Love — guitar
Lamarquis Jefferson — bass guitar

Charts

Weekly charts

Year-end charts

Decade-end charts

All-time charts

Certifications

Release history

See also
List of Hot 100 number-one singles of 2004 (U.S.)
List of number-one R&B singles of 2004 (U.S.)
List of number-one singles from the 2000s (UK)

References

Bibliography
 Ciara (2006). BET Official presents Ciara: The Evolution (BET Exclusive DVD) New York: LaFace Records and Zomba Label Group – Ciara explains the writing process of "Goodies" and filming the music video.

2004 debut singles
2004 songs
Answer songs
Billboard Hot 100 number-one singles
Ciara songs
Crunk songs
LaFace Records singles
Music videos directed by Benny Boom
Petey Pablo songs
Song recordings produced by Lil Jon
Songs written by Ciara
Songs written by Craig Love
Songs written by Lil Jon
Songs written by Sean Garrett
Sony BMG singles
UK Singles Chart number-one singles